ZBM-TV (channel 9) is a television station in Hamilton, Bermuda, serving the British territory as an affiliate of CBS. It is owned by the Bermuda Broadcasting Company alongside ABC affiliate ZFB-TV (channel 7). The two stations share studios on Fort Hill Road in Devonshire Parish.

History
ZBM-TV was founded in 1958 by Bermuda Broadcasting Company as the first local television station in Bermuda. Before then, residents living near Kindley Field at the East End of Bermuda could watch television via unauthorized reception of the TV signal on base. The station affiliated with CBS in 1960, making it one of the few American network affiliates outside of the United States and its territories. The station transitioned to color in 1968, possibly the first color television service on the island of Bermuda. Originally, ZBM-TV broadcast on channel 10, but in 1982, Capital Broadcasting Company merged with Bermuda Broadcasting Company, and ZBM-TV was moved to channel 9.

Technical information

Subchannel

Analog-to-digital conversion
On the week of March 9, 2016, Bermuda Broadcasting ended analog broadcasts and converted ZFB-TV and ZBM-TV to digital, with both services sharing a multiplex on channel 20. The transmitter was knocked out of service some time later when lightning struck the transmitter. In 2017, in time for the America's Cup, Bermuda Broadcasting completed an upgrade that added a second transmitter for ZFB, using virtual channel 19.7, allowing both ZFB and ZBM to broadcast in HD; it also replaced its radio transmitters. With the upgrade, ZBM began using virtual channel 20.9.

References

External links
 
 Bermuda News media (inactive)

Television stations in Bermuda
CBS network affiliates
Television channels and stations established in 1958
1958 establishments in Bermuda
Transnational network affiliates